Founded in 1885, the Covington and Macon Railroad began operations in 1887 between Macon and Hillsboro, Georgia, USA.  It eventually stretched , operating from Macon to Athens, Georgia, however it went bankrupt and was sold at public auction in 1891.  It was then reorganized as the Macon and Northern Railroad.

References

Defunct Georgia (U.S. state) railroads
Railway companies established in 1885
Railway companies disestablished in 1891
Predecessors of the Central of Georgia Railway